Burkhard Schittny is a German visual artist.

Life and career 
Schittny first studied fashion design at the University of the Arts in Bremen, then he shifted the focus of his studies to photography. He graduated in 1997 with a photographic work inspired by the painter Francis Bacon.

His clients have included The New York Times Magazine, New York Magazine, Wired, and Fortune.

Awards 
 1996: Nachwuchs Förderpreis 96, Kodak
 1997: PIXEL 2 Digital Imaging Award 97, Kodak, 3rd Prize Winner
 1998: Inszenierte Fotografie 3, ColorService Stuttgart, Winner
 1998: Reinhart Wolf Preis 98, Award
 1999: Reinhart Wolf Preis 99, Award
 2000: DAAD annual scholarship for London
 2005: ADC Switzerland, Shortlist
 2005: ADC New York, Distinctive Merit Award
 2010: London Photographic Association, Urbanscape, Bronze Winner

References

External links 
 
 Burkhard Schittny at Galerie Anita Beckers
 Burkhard Schittny at Blink Video

1966 births
Living people
Fine art photographers
Photographers from Bremen (state)
German contemporary artists
20th-century German artists
21st-century German artists
German video artists
German performance artists
German conceptual artists